Liocarcinus depurator, sometimes called the harbour crab or sandy swimming crab, is a species of crab found in the North Sea, Atlantic Ocean, Mediterranean Sea, and Black Sea.

The species was first described by Carl Linnaeus in 1758, in his 10th edition of Systema Naturae. It has a synonym, Portunus plicatus, which was given by Antoine Risso in 1816.

The females in this species reach maturity within their first year of life. They reach their peak of reproduction during the winter time in the Mediterranean.

References

Portunoidea
Crustaceans of the Atlantic Ocean
Crustaceans described in 1758
Taxa named by Carl Linnaeus